Ukert is a lunar impact crater that lies on a strip of rugged ground between Mare Vaporum to the north and Sinus Medii in the south. It was named after German historian Friedrich August Ukert. It is located to the north-northwest of the crater Triesnecker and northeast of the crater pair of Pallas and Murchison.

The outer rim of this crater is not quite circular, with outward bulges to the north and the east. The interior floor is irregular in places, with a central ridge running from crater midpoint down to the southern wall. There is a tiny craterlet along the northern rim, but otherwise the crater contains no impacts of note.

Satellite craters
By convention these features are identified on lunar maps by placing the letter on the side of the crater midpoint that is closest to Ukert.

References

External links

Ukert at The Moon Wiki
  - includes Lunar V

Impact craters on the Moon